Two centuries after his birth Marx remains both controversial and relevant, as the unveiling of a 4.5m statue of him (sculpted by Wu Weishan) in his birthplace of Trier, Germany in 2018 demonstrates. Hulking statues of him remain in the former capital of the defunct German Democratic Republic.

Germany

Gelsenkirchen
Karl Marx Monument, Chemnitz, Germany
Marx and Engels monument, Marx-Engels Forum Berlin, Germany
Statue created by Chinese artist Wu Weishan and donated by China to Trier, Germany, birthplace of Karl Marx
Leipzig, Germany.

Russia
In Moscow, Russia
Marx monument in Kaliningrad
Bust of Marx at Liberty Square in Tolyatti

Other countries

In Karlovy Vary, Czech Republic
At Fuxing Park Shanghai, China
Marx and Engels statue in Calcutta, India
At Kepa Enbeita Urretxindorra Square, Bilbao, Spain
Marx statue in METU, Ankara, Turkey
Large Marx bust in Chisinau, Moldova

See also
List of statues of Lenin
List of statues of Stalin

References

Marx
 
Marx
Marx